Daniel Euclides Moreno (born 18 December 1948), known as just Moreno, is a Brazilian former footballer who played as a forward. He competed in the men's tournament at the 1968 Summer Olympics.

References

External links
 

1948 births
Living people
Brazilian footballers
Association football forwards
Brazil international footballers
Olympic footballers of Brazil
Footballers at the 1968 Summer Olympics
Footballers from São Paulo
Sociedade Esportiva Palmeiras players